In botany, a plant shoot consists of any plant stem together with its appendages, leaves and lateral buds, flowering stems, and flower buds.  The new growth from seed germination that grows upward is a shoot where leaves will develop.  In the spring, perennial plant shoots are the new growth that grows from the ground in herbaceous plants or the new stem or flower growth that grows on woody plants.

In everyday speech, shoots are often synonymous with stems. Stems, which are an integral component of shoots, provide an axis for buds, fruits, and leaves.

Young shoots are often eaten by animals because the  fibers in the new growth have not yet completed secondary cell wall development, making the young shoots softer and easier to chew and digest. As shoots grow and age, the cells develop secondary cell walls that have a hard and tough structure. Some plants (e.g. bracken) produce toxins that make their shoots inedible or less palatable.

Shoot types of woody plants

Many woody plants have distinct short shoots and long shoots. In some angiosperms, the short shoots, also called spur shoots or fruit spurs, produce the majority of flowers and fruit. A similar pattern occurs in some conifers and in Ginkgo, although the "short shoots" of some genera such as Picea are so small that they can be mistaken for part of the leaf that they have produced.

A related phenomenon is seasonal heterophylly, which involves visibly different leaves from spring growth and later lammas growth. Whereas spring growth mostly comes from buds formed the previous season, and often includes flowers, lammas growth often involves long shoots.

See also
 Bud
 Crown (botany)
 Heteroblasty (botany), an abrupt change in the growth pattern of some plants as they mature
 Lateral shoot
 Seedling
 Sterigma, the "woody peg" below the leaf of some conifers
 Thorn (botany), true thorns, as distinct from spines or prickles, are short shoots

References 

Plant morphology